is a Japanese cyclist, who currently rides for UCI Continental team .

In May 2019, he was named in the startlist for the 2019 Giro d'Italia. On the first stage, he finished outside the time limit and had to leave the race.

Major results

2011
 1st  Road race, National Junior Road Championships
2012
 Asian Junior Road Championships
1st Road race
2nd Time trial
 National Junior Road Championships
1st  Time trial
2nd Road race
2013
 2nd Road race, National Under-23 Road Championships
 9th Overall Tour de Hokkaido
2017
 5th Road race, National Road Championships
2019
 9th Overall Tour of Thailand

Grand Tour general classification results timeline

References

External links

1994 births
Living people
Japanese male cyclists
Sportspeople from Tokyo